Macomb Municipal Airport  is a public airport located three statute miles (5 km) north of the central business district of Macomb, a city in McDonough County, Illinois, United States. It is owned by the Macomb Airport Authority.

Facilities and aircraft 

For the 12-month period ending December 31, 2006, the airport had 9,000 aircraft operations, an average of 24 per day: 72% general aviation and 28% air taxi. There are 31 aircraft based at this airport: 77% single-engine and 23% multi-engine.

References

External links 

Airports in Illinois
Buildings and structures in McDonough County, Illinois